Nicolas Thevenin (born 5 June 1958) is a French prelate of the Catholic Church who works in the diplomatic service of the Holy See. He has been Apostolic Nuncio to Egypt since 2019.

Biography 
Nicolas Henry Marie Denis Thevenin was born on 5 June 1958 in Saint-Dizier in the Haute-Marne region of France. He graduated from Commercial Institute of Nancy in 1981.

He entered the seminary of Genoa, Italy, as a member of the Community of Saint Martin. He holds a doctorate in canon law.

He was ordained a priest on 4 July 1989 and was incardinated in the Archdiocese of Genoa.

He joined the diplomatic services of the Holy See on 1 July 1994. His service took him to India, the Democratic Republic of the Congo, Belgium, Lebanon, Cuba, and Bulgaria. In 2005 he joined the staff of the State Relations Section of the Secretariat of State in Rome. In 2006, when Cardinal Tarcisio Bertone was appointed Secretary of State, Thévenin joined his private secretariat.

On 8 January 2010, he was appointed Apostolic Protonotary. On 5 March 2011, French President Nicolas Sarkozy awarded him the Legion of Honor.

On 15 December 2012, Pope Benedict XVI named him titular archbishop of Aeclanum and assigned him the rank of apostolic nuncio. On 5 January 2013, he was appointed Apostolic Nuncio to Guatemala. On 6 January he received his episcopal consecration from Pope Benedict XVI.

On 4 November 2019, Pope Francis named him Apostolic Nuncio to Egypt and Apostolic Delegate to the Arab League.

See also 
 List of heads of the diplomatic missions of the Holy See
Apostolic Nuncio
Apostolic Nunciature to Egypt
Catholic Church in Egypt

References

External links
Catholic Hierarchy: Archbishop Nicolas Henry Marie Denis Thevenin 

1958 births
Living people
People from Saint-Dizier
Apostolic Nuncios to Guatemala
Apostolic Nuncios to Egypt
Apostolic Nuncios to the Arab League